The 2004 U.S. Men's Clay Court Championships was a tennis tournament played on outdoor clay courts at the Westside Tennis Club in Houston, Texas in the United States and was part of the International Series of the 2004 ATP Tour. It was the 36th edition of the tournament and was held from April 12 through April 18, 2004. Tommy Haas won the singles title.

Finals

Singles

 Tommy Haas defeated  Andy Roddick 6–3, 6–4
 It was Haas's 1st title of the year and the 6th of his career.

Doubles

 James Blake /  Mardy Fish defeated  Rick Leach /  Brian MacPhie 6–3, 6–4
 It was Blake's 2nd title of the year and the 5th of his career. It was Fish's 2nd title of the year and the 4th of his career.

References

External links
 Official website
 ATP tournament profile

 
U.S. Men's Clay Court Championships
U.S. Men's Clay Court Championships
U.S. Men's Clay Court Championships
U.S. Men's Clay Court Championships
U.S. Men's Clay Court Championships